Witold Majewski (4 September 1930 – 4 October 2005) was a Polish footballer. He played in seven matches for the Poland national football team from 1958 to 1962.

References

External links
 

1930 births
2005 deaths
Polish footballers
Poland international footballers
Place of birth missing
Association footballers not categorized by position